Luc Desilets  is a Canadian politician. He was elected to the House of Commons of Canada in the 2019 election from Rivière-des-Mille-Îles as a member of the Bloc Québécois.

Electoral record

References

External links

Bloc Québécois MPs
Members of the House of Commons of Canada from Quebec
21st-century Canadian politicians
Living people
Year of birth missing (living people)
People from Rosemère, Quebec